Savika Refa Zahira (born in Jakarta, 4 April 2004) is an Indonesian figure skater. She competed at the 2019 Southeast Asian Games in Manila, Philippines.

Results 
CS: Challenger Series; JGP: Junior Grand Prix

References 

2004 births
Living people
Sportspeople from Jakarta
Indonesian figure skaters
Southeast Asian Games bronze medalists for Indonesia
Southeast Asian Games medalists in figure skating
Competitors at the 2019 Southeast Asian Games